Daniel Brainard (May 15, 1812 – October 10, 1866) was a Chicago-based surgeon and founder of Rush Medical College.

Personal Life 
Brainard came to Chicago in 1836, at the age of 24, and immediately set up a medical practice, soon after which he applied to the Illinois state legislature for a charter for what was to become Rush Medical College. The charter was granted on March 2, 1837, two days before the city of Chicago was incorporated. He chose the name for the school after Benjamin Rush, the only physician with medical training to sign the Declaration of Independence.

Career 
Brainard made his reputation in Chicago by successfully amputating at the hip joint the leg of an injured canal worker, the first such operation in the United States. His other accomplishments include being the city’s first surgeon, editor of the Illinois Medical and Surgical Journal, proponent of the first general hospital for the city and then the first county hospital. He was also an organizer for the county and state medical societies.

Brainard was the president and professor of surgery at Rush from its founding until his death at age 54 of cholera, a subject he had lectured on a few hours before he himself succumbed to the disease.

Brainard ran for mayor of Chicago in 1858.

By 1897, Rush Medical College was the largest medical school in America. Rush Medical College is now part of Rush University and its affiliated medical center Rush University Medical Center, formerly Rush-Presbyterian-St. Luke's Medical Center.

References

See also
 Rush University Medical Center

American surgeons
University and college founders
People from Chicago
1812 births
1866 deaths
Rush University
Deaths from cholera